Lyclene mesilaulinea is a moth of the subfamily Arctiinae. It was described by Jeremy Daniel Holloway in 2001. It is found on Borneo. The habitat consists of montane forests.

The length of the forewings is 12–13 mm for males and 13–14 mm females.

References

Nudariina
Moths described in 2001
Moths of Asia